Dutch, the Magazine  is a bi-monthly Canadian magazine about The Netherlands and its people. It covers issues like society, politics, culture, history, food and travel. It covers the Netherlands and its inhabitants and Dutch settlements abroad, especially in North America. The magazine was launched in August 2011 with an initial circulation of 2,500 in Canada and the USA. Contributors include Tom Bijvoet the editor of Maandblad de Krant, Brian Bramson author of a satirical book about life in the Netherlands and Jesse van Muylwijck, prize winning Dutch comic strip artist.

References

External links
 Dutch, the magazine homepage
 Publisher website

2011 establishments in Canada
Bi-monthly magazines published in Canada
Dutch-Canadian culture
Magazines established in 2011
Magazines published in Ontario

Multicultural and ethnic magazines in Canada